In enzymology, a deacetylcephalosporin-C acetyltransferase is an enzyme that catalyzes the chemical reaction

acetyl-CoA + deacetylcephalosporin C  CoA + cephalosporin C

Thus, the two substrates of this enzyme are acetyl-CoA and deacetylcephalosporin C, whereas its two products are CoA and cephalosporin C.

This enzyme belongs to the family of transferases, specifically those acyltransferases transferring groups other than aminoacyl groups.  The systematic name of this enzyme class is acetyl-CoA:deacetylcephalosporin-C O-acetyltransferase. Other names in common use include acetyl-CoA:deacetylcephalosporin-C acetyltransferase, DAC acetyltransferase, cefG, deacetylcephalosporin C acetyltransferase, acetyl coenzyme A:DAC acetyltransferase, acetyl-CoA:DAC acetyltransferase, CPC acetylhydrolase, acetyl-CoA:DAC O-acetyltransferase, and DAC-AT.  This enzyme participates in penicillin and cephalosporin biosynthesis.

References

 
 
 
 
 
 

EC 2.3.1
Enzymes of unknown structure